The 1856 United States presidential election in New York took place on November 4, 1856, as part of the 1856 United States presidential election. Voters chose 35 representatives, or electors to the Electoral College, who voted for president and vice president.

New York was won by California Senator John C. Frémont (R–California), running with former Senator William L. Dayton (New Jersey), with 46.27% of the popular vote, against Senator James Buchanan (D–Pennsylvania), running with Representative and future presidential candidate in the 1860 presidential election John C. Breckinridge, with 32.84% of the popular vote and the 13th president of the United States Millard Fillmore (A–New York), running with the 2nd U.S. Ambassador to Germany Andrew Jackson Donelson, with 20.89% of the popular vote.

James Buchanan went on to win the presidential election but this election would end the Democratic Party's support from New York which they won five out of seven times since 1828 and for the next 12 years a Democrat would not win New York until Horatio Seymour's narrow victory in 1868.

Frémont, the first presidential nominee of the newly formed Republican Party, would be the first of just three Republicans ever to carry the state without winning the presidency, the other two being Charles Evans Hughes in 1916 and Thomas E. Dewey in 1948 (both New Yorkers). It was also the first time since voting for DeWitt Clinton in 1812 that New York backed a losing presidential candidate. This remains the only presidential election in history where New York voted Republican while neighboring Pennsylvania voted Democratic.

Results

Results by County

See also
 United States presidential elections in New York

References

New York
1856
1856 New York (state) elections